William Calvin Oates (either November 30 or December 1, 1835September 9, 1910) was a colonel in the Confederate States Army during the American Civil War, the 29th Governor of Alabama from 1894 to 1896, and a brigadier general in the U.S. Army during the Spanish–American War.

Early life
Oates was born in Pike County, Alabama, to William and Sarah (Sellers) Oates, a poor farming family. All of his ancestors came to North America during the colonial era, and all of them came from the two countries of England and Wales. At the age of 17, he believed that he had killed a man in a violent brawl and left home for Florida. Oates became a drifter, settling in Texas for a couple of years before returning to Alabama at the urging of his younger brother John, who the family had dispatched to locate him. He studied law at the Lawrenceville Academy in Lawrenceville and passed the bar examination, and then opened a practice in Abbeville.

Civil War

William C. Oates joined the Confederate States Army in July 1861 and entered the army as Captain, 15th Alabama Infantry Regiment, and eventually became the commander of the 15th Alabama Infantry Regiment in the spring of 1863. He fought in the Battle of Gettysburg, leading his troops in a series of charges on Little Round Top, where his brother John was killed. Oates believed that if his regiment had been able to take Little Round Top, the Army of Northern Virginia might have won the battle and marched on to take Washington, D.C. Oates later stated that if even a single additional Confederate regiment had joined the assault, the attack could have succeeded, turning the U.S. flank and threatening the entire Army of the Potomac.

Oates stated:

Oates later participated in the battles of Chickamauga, the Wilderness, Spotsylvania Court House, and Cold Harbor. After losing command of his colonelcy of the 15th Alabama because of a political move, he was made colonel of the 48th Alabama by Confederate President Jefferson Davis. Oates was wounded during the Battle of Fussell's Mill on the outskirts of Richmond, losing his right arm, which ended his active service.

Postbellum career
Oates resumed his law practice in Henry County, Alabama, and served as a delegate to the 1868 Democratic National Convention. From 1870 to 1872, he was a member of the Alabama House of Representatives. In 1880, he was elected to the U.S. House of Representatives, serving seven consecutive terms. Oates married Sarah Toney of Eufaula on March 28, 1882, and they had one son, William Calvin, Jr., who eventually joined his father in the law practice.

Oates was elected governor of Alabama in 1894 in a bitter campaign. Two years later, he unsuccessfully tried to secure his party's nomination as a candidate for the United States Senate. President William McKinley commissioned Oates as a brigadier general in 1898, and he served in the Spanish–American War. He returned to his law practice and speculated in real estate. He tried unsuccessfully to have a monument erected at Gettysburg to his comrades in the old 15th Alabama, including his fallen brother.

Oates died in Montgomery, buried in Oakwood Cemetery.

Notes

References
 LaFantasie, Glenn W. "The Inimitable William C. Oates."National Park Service website, accessed 10/26/07.

Further reading
 LaFantasie, Glenn W. Gettysburg Requiem: The Life and Lost Causes of Confederate Colonel William C. Oates. New York: Oxford University Press, 2005. .
 Oates, William C. The War Between the Union and the Confederacy and Its Lost Opportunities. Dayton, OH: Morningside Bookshop, 1974. . First published 1905 by Neale Publishing Co.

External links
 Encyclopedia of Alabama

 

1835 births
1910 deaths
People from Pike County, Alabama
American amputees
American politicians with disabilities
Democratic Party governors of Alabama
Democratic Party members of the Alabama House of Representatives
Confederate States Army officers
People of Alabama in the American Civil War
United States Army officers
American military personnel of the Spanish–American War
Democratic Party members of the United States House of Representatives from Alabama
19th-century American politicians
19th-century American lawyers